Byron Clark Webster (born 31 March 1987) is an English professional footballer who plays as a centre back  for Bromley.

Early and personal life
Webster was born in Leeds, West Yorkshire and raised in Sherburn in Elmet, North Yorkshire. He was educated at Sherburn High School and was able to complete a BTEC National Diploma during his footballing career.

Career

Early career
Webster made his first-team debut for York City against Burton Albion in the Conference National on 29 December 2004. He scored his first goal for the club in a 2–2 draw against Stevenage Borough on 8 January 2005. He finished the 2004–05 season with 16 appearances and one goal. He made four appearances in all competitions in 2005–06. He signed his first professional contract with York in July 2006. He made four appearances in 2006–07, before being released in February 2007 at his own request. After his release, Webster contemplated retiring and enrolling in university. He signed for Conference North club Harrogate Town in the same month and made his debut against Scarborough in a 1–0 home defeat on 3 February 2007. Whilst being registered with Harrogate, he played three games for Whitby Town in the Northern Premier League Premier Division. He ended the season with nine appearances for Harrogate.

Baník Most
Webster signed a one-year contract with Czech First League club FK SIAD Most (known as FK Baník Most from 2008 onwards) in August 2007, with an option of an extension until 2010. He made his debut in a 5–2 defeat against Baník Ostrava on 11 August 2007. The 2007–08 concluded with Most suffering relegation to the Czech 2. Liga, although Webster signed a new two-year contract with the club. He started a trial spell at Scottish Premier League club Motherwell in December 2008. The club entered negotiations over a deal for Webster to sign on loan for the rest of the 2008–09 season.

Doncaster Rovers
Webster had a trial with Bury in July 2009, before leaving to trial with Doncaster Rovers. He gave a "composed performance" in a pre-season friendly against Wolverhampton Wanderers and Doncaster manager Sean O'Driscoll was looking to complete a deal for him to sign for the club. He eventually signed for the Championship club on an initial two-year contract for an undisclosed fee on 5 August 2009. Webster made his Doncaster debut in a 1–0 victory away to Notts County in the League Cup first round on 11 August 2009. He joined League Two club Hereford United on 18 November 2010 on a one-month loan.

Northampton Town
On 17 March 2011, Webster joined League Two club Northampton Town on loan until the end of 2010–11. On 17 May 2011, Webster was released by Doncaster and on the same day Northampton signed him permanently on a two-year contract.

Yeovil Town
On 4 July 2012, Webster's contract with Northampton Town was terminated by mutual consent and later that day signed for League One club Yeovil Town on a two-year contract. He scored his first goal for Yeovil in 2–1 victory over Bury, after an attempted clearance from a corner struck him, sending it into the goal. Webster played in the 2–1 victory over Brentford in the 2013 League One play-off final at Wembley Stadium on 19 May 2013, seeing Yeovil win promotion to the Championship for the first time in their history. He finished 2012–13 with 53 appearances and five goals for Yeovil. Webster made 45 appearances and scored four goals in 2013–14 as Yeovil were relegated to League One in bottom place.

Millwall
Webster turned down a new contract with Yeovil to sign a two-year contract with Championship club Millwall on 24 June 2014.

On 19 February 2015, Webster returned to Yeovil Town on loan until the end of the 2014–15 season.

On 20 May 2017, Webster started for Millwall as they beat Bradford City 1–0 at Wembley Stadium in the 2017 League One play-off final, earning promotion back to the Championship after a two-year absence.

He was offered a new contract by Millwall at the end of the 2017–18 season.

Scunthorpe United
Webster signed for League One club Scunthorpe United on 4 January 2019 on a contract until the end of the 2018–19 season. He was released by Scunthorpe at the end of 2018–19.

Carlisle United
Webster signed for League Two club Carlisle United on 24 June 2019 a one-year contract.

Bromley
On 7 September 2020, it was announced that Webster had signed for National League Club Bromley, linking up with former Millwall team mate Alan Dunne.

Career statistics

Honours
Yeovil Town
Football League One play-offs: 2013

Millwall
EFL League One play-offs: 2017

Bromley
FA Trophy: 2021–22

References

External links

Profile at the Carlisle United F.C. website

 Byron Webster Interview

1987 births
Living people
Footballers from Leeds
People from Sherburn in Elmet
Footballers from North Yorkshire
English footballers
Association football defenders
York City F.C. players
Harrogate Town A.F.C. players
Whitby Town F.C. players
FK Baník Most players
Doncaster Rovers F.C. players
Hereford United F.C. players
Northampton Town F.C. players
Yeovil Town F.C. players
Millwall F.C. players
Scunthorpe United F.C. players
Carlisle United F.C. players
Bromley F.C. players
National League (English football) players
Northern Premier League players
Czech First League players
Czech National Football League players
English Football League players
English expatriate footballers
Expatriate footballers in the Czech Republic
English expatriate sportspeople in the Czech Republic